The Hamilton Town Belt, also known as the Green Belt, is a series of public parks in Hamilton, New Zealand that surround the original 1877 city boundaries. Many of the cities notable venues and attractions are located on the belt, including Hamilton Gardens, Waikato Stadium, Seddon Park, Hamilton Girls' High School, Founders Theatre and the Hamilton Lake Domain.

The eastern section of the belt separates the suburbs of Hamilton East and Hillcrest.

See also
Suburbs of Hamilton, New Zealand

References

Town Belt
Town Belt
Parks in New Zealand
Protected areas of Waikato